Dorothy Meyer (November 6, 1924 – September 24, 1987) was an American character actress of film and television who made a name for herself portraying wisecracking maids, neighbors, friends, nurses, and church ladies throughout the 1970s and 1980s.

Life and career
She was born in Indianapolis, Indiana, on November 6, 1924, the daughter of a Presbyterian minister, a religion to which she adhered to throughout her entire life. During her childhood, she initially began her career as an actress singing and dancing in numerous Christian themed productions on The Bible Belt and was later inspired to further pursue acting following the Oscar win of African-American actress Hattie McDaniel in Gone with the Wind. During World War II, she worked as both a secretary and typist in a steel factory in her native Indiana during the daytime and later started appearing in amateur theatre during nights and her weekends off. In the early 1950s, she moved to California and began her career modeling, appearing in advertisements for such popular brand names as Maxwell House Coffee, Hallmark Greeting Cards, Westinghouse, Walgreens, Sears Roebuck, and Hersey's Chocolates. After two decades of advertisement modeling, she made her small screen debut in a 1971 episode of The Bill Cosby Show. Between 1971 and 1987, she would have 42 credits to her resume, including appearances on such syndicated programs as That's My Mama, Sanford and Son, The Waltons, Starsky & Hutch, The Jeffersons, Lou Grant, Hill Street Blues, Murder, She Wrote, and 227. She enjoyed a successful career and appeared alongside such notables as Linda Blair, Richard Pryor, and Muhammad Ali.

Aside from acting, she was also noted as being a staunch liberal Democrat and African American rights activist, who was very supportive of the National Association for the Advancement of Colored People and spoke on numerous occasions regarding civil liberties in low-income communities. She also had a great deal of support and admiration for the administrations of John F. Kennedy and Jimmy Carter. Meyer died in Los Angeles, California on September 24, 1987, from undisclosed causes, at the age of 62. As per her last will and testament, was cremated with her ashes scattered at sea. She was unmarried, had no children, and her only survivors were distant cousins, two older brothers, one sister, and a few nieces and nephews. Two films she had made at the time of her death, Moving (1988) and Wildfire (1988), were released posthumously.

Filmography

References

External links
 

1924 births
1987 deaths
American Presbyterians
California Democrats
Actresses from Indiana
Indiana Democrats
American film actresses
American television actresses
Female models from Indiana
20th-century American memoirists
20th-century American actresses
Activists for African-American civil rights
African-American actresses
American stage actresses
American women memoirists
20th-century African-American women writers
20th-century American women writers
20th-century African-American writers